The Wingert House is a nineteenth-century farmhouse located at 6231 North Canfield Avenue in Chicago, Illinois. One of the oldest surviving farmhouses within the Chicago city limits, the building received Chicago Landmark status on July 31, 1990.  It is part of the Norwood Park neighborhood.

The house was built in 1854 as the home of John Wingert, a German immigrant who had fled his home country due to religious persecution. A two-story Italianate style section was added between 1868 and 1875. The Wingert House is one of the few extant buildings in Chicago that predate the Great Fire of 1871.

Fire
"The Wingert House caught fire on March 10, 2021. There was some damage to the rear, but the window frames and roofline were basically intact."

See also
 Noble–Seymour–Crippen House, also located in Norwood Park

Notes

Houses in Chicago
Houses completed in 1854
Chicago Landmarks